The 2011 AFC U-19 Women's Championship was the 6th edition of the AFC U-19 Women's Championship. Vietnam hosted the tournament from 6 to 16 October 2011. The top 3 teams Japan, North Korea, and China qualified to the 2012 FIFA U-20 Women's World Cup.  Japan was later named host of the U-20 Women's World Cup, so their spot was awarded to fourth-place finisher South Korea.

Seeding 
The tournament format is:

Qualification 

Uzbekistan and Iran progressed from the first qualifying round as winners but then finished in the last two places in the second qualification round. Vietnam came through the qualification as the group winner in the 2nd qualification round.

Final round

Venues 
The host city was Ho Chi Minh City in Vietnam. The Final round was played at the following stadiums.

 Thanh Long Sports Centre
 Thong Nhat Stadium

Results 
''All matches were held in Ho Chi Minh City, Vietnam (UTC+7)

Winners

Awards 
The following awards were given.

Goalscorers 
5 goals
 Mai Kyokawa
 Yun Hyon-Hi

4 goals
 Kumi Yokoyama

3 goals
 Emily Gielnik
 Yao Shuangyan

2 goals

 Ni Mengjie
 Lee Geummin
 Lee Jungeun
 Seo Hyunsook
 Kwon Song-Hwa
 Kim Un-Hwa
 Nguyễn Thị Nguyệt
 Phạm Hoàng Quỳnh

1 goal

 Ashley Sarine Brown
 Emily van Egmond
 Linda Jane O'Neill
 Tara Jayne Andrews
 Wang Tingting
 Akane Saito
 Haruka Hamada
 Hanae Shibata
 Yoko Tanaka
 Choi Mirae
 Choi Yoojung
 Jang Selgi
 Kim Ji-Hye
 Moon Mira
 Jon Myong-Hwa
 Kim Jo-Ran
 Kim Su-Gyong
 Kim Un-Ju
 Phan Thi Trang

Own goal
 Nguyễn Thị Hương (playing against China PR)

See also 
 2012 FIFA U-20 Women's World Cup
 2011 AFC U-16 Women's Championship

References

External links 
 Official tournament website

 
Women's Championship
2011 AFC U-19 Women's Championship
2011
AFc
2011 in Vietnamese football
2011 in youth association football